The 32nd Engineer Regiment is a military engineer regiment of the Italian Army based in Fossano in Piedmont. Formed on 24 September 2004 the regiment is the Italian Army's youngest engineer regiment and specializes in mountain combat. Its name was chosen to commemorate the XXXII Sapper Battalion, which participated in the Western Desert Campaign of World War II, while the regiment's only battalion name commemorates the  XXX Sappers Battalion, which participated in the Italian campaign on the Eastern Front. Since its formation on 1 September 2002 as 32nd Engineer Battalion the unit has been part of the Alpine Brigade "Taurinense". Together with the other units of the Taurinense brigade the regiment shares the distinctive Cappello Alpino.

History

World War II

XXXII Sappers Battalion 
On 1 December 1940 the Royal Italian Army Sappers School in Civitavecchia formed the 3rd Sappers Company "Folgore" ("Thunderbolt") and the 4th Sappers Company "Uragano" ("Hurricane"). At the same time the school also trained the personnel, which would go on to form the VIII, XXX, and XXXI sappers battalions. On 14 January 1941 the two companies were sent to Libya, where they formed a provisional battalion under the 1st Special Engineer Grouping. As part of Rommel's Afrika Korps the battalion participated in Rommel's first offensive Operation Sonnenblume. On 15 August 1941, congruent to the activation of Panzer Army Africa, the battalion was renamed XXXII Sappers Battalion and participated in all battles of the Western Desert Campaign until the battalion was disbanded on 1 August 1942 after having suffered heavy casualties during the First Battle of El Alamein. The 70 survivors of the battalion were transferred to the XXXI Sappers Battalion, which was attached to the 185th Paratroopers Division "Folgore" for the Second Battle of El Alamein. After the defeat in the Second Battle of El Alamein the XXXI Sappers Battalion retreated with the rest of the Italian-German forces to Tunisia, where it surrendered at the end of the Tunisian Campaign on 13 May 1943. For its service in North Africa the XXXII Sappers Battalion was awarded a Bronze Medal of Military Valour.

XXX Sappers Battalion 
The XXX Sappers Battalion command was activated on 15 March 1941 by the depot of the 4th Engineer Regiment in Verona with the 5th Sappers Company "Tormenta" ("Blizzard"), 6th Sappers Company "Teste Dure" ("Hard Skulls"), and 9th Sappers Company "Valanga" ("Avalanche"), which had all been formed earlier by the Sappers School in Civitavecchia. At the time of the battalion's founding the three companies were fighting in the Greco-Italian War and the headquarters quickly travelled to Albania to take command of the companies. After the German invasion of Greece and the Greek surrender the battalion returned to Italy and was garrisoned in Ronchi dei Legionari. During this time the 6th Sappers Company was transferred to the 80th Airlanding Division "La Spezia" and the 5th Sappers Company changed its number to 6th.

On 17 March 1942 the battalion was assigned to support the Alpini of the Alpine Army Corps of the 8th Italian Army, which was sent to the Eastern Front. The battalion left Italy on 21 July 1942 and arrived in Voroshilovgrad in early September 1942 and entered soon after the front on the Don river. The battalion retreated with the Alpine Corps after Soviet forces had broken through the front on both flanks of the Italian 8th Army in Operation Little Saturn. The retreat through the frozen steppe and constant skirmishes with Soviet forces decimated the XXX Sappers Battalion, which barely escaped annihilation during the Battle of Nikolayevka. Of the 23 officers, 30 non-commissioned officers and 427 enlisted present on 1 January 1943 only 121 survived the retreat from the Don and the Battle of Nikolayevka. The battalion was disbanded in late January for the losses it had suffered and in 1988 the XXX Sappers Battalion was awarded a Silver Medal of Military Valour for its conduct in Ukraine and Russia.

Cold War 
During the 1975 army reform the Italian Army renamed the XXXI Sappers Fortification Battalion 3rd Sappers Battalion "Verbano", which consisted of the 30th, 31st, and 32nd companies, each of which carried on the traditions of one of the three World War II-era battalions.

Recent times 

On 1 September 2002 the 32nd Engineer Battalion was reformed in Turin by reorganized the 2nd Ferrovieri Battalion (Operations) of the Ferrovieri Engineer Regiment. The battalion was merged on the same date with the Engineer Company of the Alpine Brigade "Taurinense" and entered the brigade as its engineer unit.

On 29 September 2004 lost its autonomy and the next day the battalion entered the newly formed 32nd Engineer Regiment as XXX Sappers Battalion, thus unifying and continuing the traditions of two of the World War II battalions. On 15 December 2016 the regiment moved from Turin to Fossano.

Current structure 
As of 2022 the 32nd Engineer Regiment consists of:

  Regimental Command, in Fossano
  5th Command and Logistic Support Company
  XXX Sappers Battalion
  3rd Sappers Company "Folgore"
  4th Deployment Support Company "Uragano"
  6th Sappers Company "Tormenta"
  9th Sappers Company "Valanga"

The Command and Logistic Support Company fields the following platoons: C3 Platoon, Transport and Materiel Platoon, Medical Platoon, Commissariat Platoon, and EOD Platoon. Each of the two sapper companies fields a Command Platoon, an Advanced Combat Reconnaissance Teams Platoon, and two sapper platoons. The Deployment Support Company and Mobility Support Company field the battalion's heavy military engineering vehicles: Biber bridgelayers, Dachs armored engineer vehicles, cranes, excavators, Medium Girder Bridges etc. The sapper companies and Command and Logistic Support Company are equipped with VTLM "Lince" and VTMM "Orso" vehicles.

See also 
 Alpine Brigade "Taurinense"

External links
Italian Army Website: 32° Reggimento Genio Guastatori

References

Alpini regiments of Italy
Engineer Regiments of Italy